KHOS-FM (92.1 FM, "Today's Traditional Country") is a radio station broadcasting a classic country music format. Licensed to Sonora, Texas, United States, radio station KHOS-FM serves the greater San Angelo area. The station is currently owned by TENN-Vol. Corp.

History
The station was assigned the call sign KVRN-FM on August 17, 1978. On April 15, 1985, the station changed its call sign to KHOS, and on March 1, 1987, to the current KHOS-FM.

References

External links

HOS-FM
Classic country radio stations in the United States